Juniperus deppeana (alligator juniper or checkerbark juniper) is a small to medium-sized tree reaching  in height. It is native to central and northern Mexico and the southwestern United States.

Description
The tree reaches , rarely , in height. The bark is usually very distinctive, unlike other junipers, hard, dark gray-brown, cracked into small square plates superficially resembling alligator skin; it is however sometimes like other junipers, with stringy vertical fissuring. These contain 2–6 seeds, which mature in about 18 months. The species is largely dioecious, producing cones of only one sex on each tree, but occasional trees are monoecious.

Taxonomy
There are five varieties, not accepted as distinct by all authorities:
Juniperus deppeana var. deppeana. Throughout the range of the species. Foliage dull gray-green with a transparent or yellowish resin spot on each leaf; cones  diameter.
Juniperus deppeana var. pachyphlaea (syn. J. pachyphlaea). Arizona, New Mexico, northernmost Mexico. Foliage strongly glaucous with a white resin spot on each leaf; cones 7–12 mm diameter.
Juniperus deppeana var. robusta (syn. J. deppeana var. patoniana). Northwestern Mexico. Cones larger,  diameter.
Juniperus deppeana var. sperryi. Western Texas, very rare. Bark furrowed, not square-cracked, branchlets pendulous; possibly a hybrid with J. flaccida.
Juniperus deppeana var. zacatecensis. Zacatecas. Cones large, 10–15 mm diameter.

Etymology 
Native American names include táscate and tláscal.

Distribution and habitat

It is native to central and northern Mexico (from Oaxaca northward) and the southwestern United States (Arizona, New Mexico, western Texas).

Ecology
The berrylike cones are eaten by birds and mammals.

Uses
Berries from alligator juniper growing in the Davis Mountains of West Texas are used to flavor gin, including one produced by WildGins Co. in Austin, Texas.

References

External links

Adams, R. P. (2004). Junipers of the World: The genus Juniperus. Trafford Publishing 
Gymnosperm Database: Juniperus deppeana
Flora of North America: Juniperus deppeana
USDA Plant Profile: Juniperus deppeana

deppeana
Trees of Northwestern Mexico
Trees of Durango
Trees of Puebla
Trees of Veracruz
Flora of Northeastern Mexico
Flora of the Southwestern United States
Trees of the Western United States
Flora of New Mexico
Trees of the Southwestern United States
Trees of the South-Central United States
Drought-tolerant trees
Least concern plants
Flora of North America
Flora of the Sierra Madre Occidental
Flora of the Sierra Madre Oriental